Kansas's 3rd congressional district is a congressional district in the U.S. state of Kansas. Located in eastern Kansas, the district encompasses all of Anderson, Franklin, Johnson and Miami counties and parts of Wyandotte County. The district includes most of the Kansas side of the Kansas City metropolitan area, including all of Overland Park, Leawood, Lenexa, Shawnee, Gardner and Olathe and parts of Kansas City.

The district is currently represented by Democrat Sharice Davids, who was first elected in 2018, defeating Republican incumbent Kevin Yoder. Reapportionment in 2022 altered the district's boundaries to add Anderson and Franklin counties and portions of Miami County. The entirety of Miami County is now in the 3rd congressional district. The southern part of Wyandotte County roughly along I-70 stayed in the district, while the area north of I-70 moved to the 2nd congressional district.

Demographics

Following redistricting after the 2000 U.S. Census, there were 672,124 people, 258,439 households, and 173,022 families residing in the district. There were 272,721 housing units at an average density of 350.7/mi2. The racial makeup of the district is 82.70% White, 8.88% Black or African American, 2.60% Asian, 0.70% Native American, 0.04% Pacific Islander, 3.09% from other races, and 1.99% from two or more races. Hispanic or Latino of any race were 6.79% of the population.

There were 258,439 households, out of which 36.52% had children under the age of 18 living with them, 53.21% were married couples living together, 10.27% had a female householder with no husband present, and 33.05% were non-families. 26.12% of all households were made up of individuals, and 7.35% had someone living alone who was 65 years of age or older. The average household size was 2.55 and the average family size was 3.11.

In the district, the population distribution by age is 26.60% under the age of 18, 10.49% from 18 to 24, 31.65% from 25 to 44, 21.17% from 45 to 64, and 10.09% who were 65 years of age or older.  The median age was 33.6 years. For every 100 females there were 95.78 males. For every 100 females age 18 and over, there were 92.54 males.

The median income for a household in the district is $51,118, and the median income for a family was $62,695. Males had a median income of $42,348 versus $30,353 for females. The per capita income for the district was $26,133. About 4.9% of families and 7.8% of the population were below the poverty line, including 8.7% of those under age 18 and 6.0% of those age 65 or over.

Among the population aged 16 years and older, 71.0% were in the civilian labor force and 0.1% were in the armed forces. Of the employed civilian workers, 12.8% were government workers and 5.6% were self-employed. Management, professional, and related occupations employed 41.5% of the workforce, and sales and office occupations an additional 28.8%. Only 0.2% were employed in farming, fishing, and forestry occupations. The largest employment by industry was: educational, health, and social services, 19.8%; professional, scientific, management, administrative, and waste management services, 12.0%; retail trade, 11.8%; and manufacturing, 10.4%. Agriculture, forestry, fishing and hunting, and mining industries only employed 0.4%.

The district's character is very different from the rest of Kansas, largely due to the influence of Kansas City and its suburbs. While Kansas's other congressional districts include significant rural territory, the 3rd is almost exclusively urban and suburban. As such, it is much friendlier to Democrats than the rest of the state. It was the only district in Kansas carried by Democrats in 2008, 2016, and 2020. The largest county, Johnson, has traditionally leaned Republican, though the brand of Republicanism practiced in the county has traditionally been a moderate one. The second-largest, Wyandotte, has long been one of the most Democratic counties in the state.

List of members representing the district

Election results from presidential races 
Results Under Current Lines (Since 2023)

Recent election results

2002

2004

2006

2008

2010

2012

2014

2016

2018

2020

2022

Historical district boundaries

See also

Kansas's congressional districts
List of United States congressional districts

References

External links
Johnson County Republican Party
Johnson County Democratic Party

03
Anderson County, Kansas
Franklin County, Kansas
Johnson County, Kansas
Miami County, Kansas
Wyandotte County, Kansas